Senator Foot or Foote may refer to:

Members of the United States Senate
Samuel A. Foot (1780–1846), U.S. Senator from Connecticut from 1827 to 1833
Solomon Foot (1802–1866), U.S. Senator from Vermont from 1851 to 1866
Henry S. Foote (1804–1880), U.S. Senator from Mississippi from 1847 to 1852

United States state senate members
Ezra Foot (1809–1885), Wisconsin State Senate
John Alfred Foot (1803–1891), Ohio State Senate
Abram W. Foote (1862–1941), Vermont State Senate
Hezekiah William Foote (1813–1899), Mississippi State Senate
Huger Lee Foote (1854–1915), Mississippi State Senate
John J. Foote (1816–1905), New York State Senate
Margie Foote (1929–2012), Nevada State Senate
Mike Foote (fl. 2010s), Colorado State Senate